Juana Bormann (or Johanna Borman; 10 September 1893 – 13 December 1945) was a German prison guard at several Nazi concentration camps from 1938, and was executed as a war criminal at Hamelin, Lower Saxony, Germany, after a court trial in 1945.

Trial and execution
At her trial, Bormann said she had joined the Auxiliary SS in 1938 "to earn more money". She first served at the Lichtenburg concentration camp in Saxony under SS Oberaufseherin Jane Bernigau with 49 other SS women.

In 1939, she was assigned to oversee a work crew at the new Ravensbrück women's camp near Berlin. In March 1942, Bormann was one of a handful of women selected for guard duty at Auschwitz in occupied Poland. Short in stature, she was known for her cruelty. Victims called her "Wiesel" (weasel) and "the woman with the dogs".

In October 1942, Bormann went to Auschwitz-Birkenau as an Aufseherin. Her supervisors included Maria Mandel, Margot Dreschel, and Irma Grese. Bormann was eventually moved to Budy, a nearby subcamp where she continued her abuse of prisoners.

In 1944, as German losses mounted, Bormann was transferred to the auxiliary camp at Hindenburg (present-day Zabrze, Poland) in Silesia. In January 1945, she returned to Ravensbrück. In March, she arrived at her last post, Bergen-Belsen, near Celle, where she served under Josef Kramer, Irma Grese and Elisabeth Volkenrath (all of whom had served with her in Birkenau). On 15 April 1945, the British Army took Bergen-Belsen, finding over 10,000 corpses and 60,000 survivors. The liberators forced all SS personnel to carry the dead.

Bormann was later incarcerated and interrogated by the British, then prosecuted at the Belsen Trial, which lasted from 17 September 1945 to 17 November 1945. The court heard testimony relating to murders she had committed at Auschwitz and Belsen, sometimes unleashing her "big bad wolfhound" German shepherd on helpless prisoners. She was found guilty, and hanged (along with Grese and Volkenrath) on 13 December 1945. Her executioner, Albert Pierrepoint, later wrote:"She limped down the corridor looking old and haggard. She was 42 [sic] years old (actual age, 52), standing only a little over five feet. She was trembling as she was put on the scale. In German she said: 'I have my feelings'."

References

1893 births
1945 deaths
Auschwitz concentration camp personnel
Belsen trial executions
Executed German women
Ravensbrück concentration camp personnel
Female guards in Nazi concentration camps